Xinxi may refer to:

Populated places
Xinxi, Yushui, a township in Yushui District, Xinyu, Jiangxi
Xinxi, Longhu, a town in Longhu District, Shantou, Guangdong
Xinxi County, an administrative division of the ancient Runan Commandery (present-day Henan and Anhui provinces)
Xinxi Village, Daba, Puning, Guangdong
Xinxi Village, Suoshi, Shuangfeng, Hunan
Xinxi Village, Yanglin, Shaoshan, Hunan
Xinxi Village, Anle District, Keelung, Taiwan
Xinxi Village, West District, Chiayi, Taiwan

Other
Xinxi, a minor character in the wuxia novel The Deer and the Cauldron by Jin Yong